The 1992 United States presidential election in North Carolina took place on November 3, 1992, and was part of the 1992 United States presidential election. Voters chose 14 representatives, or electors to the Electoral College, who voted for president and vice president.

North Carolina was very narrowly won by incumbent Republican President George H. W. Bush of Texas over his Democratic challenger, Governor Bill Clinton of Arkansas. Bush took 43.44% of the vote to Clinton’s 42.65%, a margin of 0.79%. North Carolina was the second-closest state in this election behind neighboring Georgia. This was also the first time since 1956 when North Carolina did not support the winning candidate. It has since gone on to back losing Republicans Bob Dole in 1996, Mitt Romney in 2012, and Donald Trump in 2020. 

Billionaire businessman Ross Perot, running as an Independent, finished in third, with 13.70% of the vote, a relatively strong showing for a third party candidate, and his second highest showing in the Southeast, behind only Florida.

Despite being from the South, Bill Clinton became the first Democrat to win the White House without carrying the state of North Carolina since James K. Polk in 1844, and Bush became the first ever Republican to carry the state while losing nationally. , the 1992 election constitutes the last occasion the following counties have supported a Democratic presidential nominee: Alleghany, Brunswick, Greene, Pamlico, Pender, Rockingham, Sampson and Yancey. This would also be the last election in which North Carolina would vote to the left of neighboring Virginia. Additionally, with Bush and Clinton each winning 50 of North Carolina's 100 counties, this remains the last time that a Republican presidential nominee has failed to win a majority of the state's counties.

Results

Results by county

References

North Carolina
1992
1992 North Carolina elections